Louis Thomas Gunnis Leonowens (25 October 1856 – 17 February 1919) was a British subject who grew up and worked in Siam (Thailand).  He was the son of Anna Leonowens, famous as the English teacher hired by King Mongkut to teach his children. Leonowens later served as an officer with the Siamese Royal Cavalry and founded a Thai trading company that still bears his name, Louis T. Leonowens Ltd. He was the basis of a major character in the 1944 novel Anna and the King of Siam, as well as other fictional works based on it.

Early life
Leonowens was the son of Anna Leonowens nee Edwards and Thomas Leon Owens. His mother, who would later become famous as the English governess to the royal Siamese children from portrayals in the 1944 fictionalized biographical novel Anna and the King of Siam and its various adaptations including the 1951 musical The King and I, was actually born and grew up in India, probably of Anglo-Indian ancestry. His father was an Irish-born, India-raised clerk; they married in 1849. The couple left India for Singapore, then part of the Straits Settlements, in 1852.

Louis was born at Lynton, Western Australia, where his father was working for the Commissariat. In 1857, the family moved to Penang, where his father was a hotel manager. His father died in 1859, and his mother moved to Singapore with Louis and his elder sister, telling the British expatriate community there that she was a genteel Welsh woman, the widow of a British army officer who had unfortunately lost her fortune.

His mother's story was believed, and she was invited, in 1862, to teach the children of King Mongkut of Siam (now Thailand). After sending Louis's sister to England to get a British education, his mother took him to Bangkok. He was raised in Siam for nearly six years and was schooled by his mother alongside the royal children, until 1867, during which he become friends with Mongkut's son and heir Prince Chulalongkorn. Louis was sent to Europe to complete his education. By 1874, he was in the United States with his mother, but he had accumulated debts. He fled the U.S. and was estranged from his mother for 19 years.

Career

In 1881, at the age of 25, he returned to Siam and was granted a commission of Captain in the Royal Cavalry by Chulalongkorn.

Leonowens in 1884 left the military and entered the teak trade. He went on in 1905 to found the Louis Thomas Leonowens Company in Siam, which became Louis T. Leonowens Ltd, an international trading company. This company remained a leading exporter of Malayan hardwoods and an importer of building materials and general merchandise at least into the 1960s, and continues to do business as a marketing and distribution company.

He became less involved in the operations of the company after 1906 and left Siam for the last time in 1913.

Personal life
Leonowens was married to:
Caroline Knox (1856–1893), the youngest daughter of Sir Thomas George Knox, British consul-general in Siam from 1868 to 1879, and his wife, Prang Yen, a Siamese noblewoman. They had one son, Thomas ("George") Knox Leonowens (1888–1953) and a daughter, Anna Harriett Leonowens (born 1890, Mrs Richard Monahan).
Reta May (1880–1936) married Leonowens in 1900. They had no children.

Leonowens died in 1919 during the global influenza pandemic. He is buried, with his second wife, in Brompton Cemetery, London.

Film and television portrayals
The young Louis Leonowens has been portrayed by numerous actors and as being from at least three different countries, including the United States, England and Wales:
 Richard Lyon in Anna and the King of Siam (1946);
 Sandy Kennedy in the 1951 musical The King and I, Jeff B. Davis in its 1985 revival, Jake Lucas in its 2015 revival and Graham Montgomery is its 2017 Broadway National Tour;
 Rex Thompson (レックス・トンプソン) in the 1956 musical film version of The King and I;
 Eric Shea in Anna and the King (1971);
 Tom Felton in the film Anna and the King, starring Jodie Foster (1999); and
 Adam Wylie (voice) in the animated film The King and I (1999).

Notes

External links
 Louis T. Leonowens, Ltd.
 Biography by Derick Garnier
 Memorial at Christ Church, Bangkok

1856 births
1919 deaths
Burials at Brompton Cemetery
Anglo-Indian people
Deaths from Spanish flu
People from Lynton, Western Australia
British expatriates in Thailand
Expatriates in the Rattanakosin Kingdom